Rhombodera megaera is a species of praying mantises in the family Mantidae, found in China and Thailand.

Description 
R. megaera is one of the largest species in the genus Rhombodera. The underside of the thorax is red.

See also
List of mantis genera and species

References

M
Mantodea of Asia
Insects described in 1904